Reynolds School District may refer to:

Reynolds School District (Oregon)
Reynolds School District (Pennsylvania)